is a regional airport in Sakata, Yamagata, Japan. The municipalities of Tsuruoka and Shōnai are also near the airport.

History
The airport opened in 1991 after lobbying efforts by local chambers of commerce, as the area was highly isolated from the major cities of Tokyo and Osaka, requiring half a day of travel to reach either. All Nippon Airways (ANA) initially operated service to both Tokyo (Haneda) and Osaka (Itami), but cancelled the Osaka service in 2009. There was also nonstop service to Sapporo from 1995 to 2007.

Seiko Epson has also used the airport for weekly employee charter flights to and from Matsumoto since 1997.

In December 2012, an ANA flight landing from Tokyo overran the runway at Shonai. There were no fatalities, but the airport was closed for the following day.

Airlines and destinations

Transportation

References

External links

 Airport Website operated by Shonai Airport Building Co., Ltd
  Ministry of Land, Infrastructure and Transport
 
 

Airports in Japan
Transport in Yamagata Prefecture
Buildings and structures in Yamagata Prefecture
Sakata, Yamagata
Airports established in 1991
1991 establishments in Japan